The Pan Burying Ground (also known as the Pan Cemetery,  East Burying Ground, and East Cemetery) is an historic cemetery on 477 Main Street in Bolton, Massachusetts. Established in 1822, the cemetery was the second in the town. It was named for the area known locally as "The Pan", which had by then become the second-largest village center in the town. The original  plot has 400 marked graves, and is presumed to contain further unmarked graves, based on a pattern of marker layout at the rear of this portion of the cemetery. It is distinctive in Bolton for its seven-chambered group tomb, built in 1839 at the southeast corner of the property.

The cemetery was listed on the National Register of Historic Places in 2007.

See also
 National Register of Historic Places listings in Worcester County, Massachusetts

References

External links
 

Cemeteries on the National Register of Historic Places in Massachusetts
Bolton, Massachusetts
Cemeteries in Worcester County, Massachusetts
National Register of Historic Places in Worcester County, Massachusetts